The 2008 ICC World Cricket League Division Five is a cricket tournament that took place between 23 and 31 May 2008 in Jersey. It formed part of the ICC World Cricket League and qualification for the 2011 World Cup tournament. Afghanistan won the competition. They went on to qualify for the 2015 Cricket World Cup and gain Test status in 2017.

Teams

The top two teams from this tournament progressed to the Division Four.

Squads

Group stage

Points Tables

Fixtures and results

Semifinals

3rd Place Playoff

Final

Plate

Final Placings

Statistics

See also
 World Cricket League

References and notes

External links
 World Cricket League structure
 Official site
 Jersey to host ICC World Cricket League Division 5 tournament
 Cricinfo article on tournament

2008, 5
International cricket competitions in Jersey
2008 in Jersey